Ronald Joseph Smith (2 May 1921 – 16 June 1995) was a notable New Zealand public servant, communist and peace activist.

He was born in Wellington, New Zealand, in 1921, and educated at Wellington College. He died in Wellington in 1995.

References

1921 births
1995 deaths
People from Wellington City
New Zealand public servants
New Zealand communists
Democratic Labour Party (New Zealand) politicians
Unsuccessful candidates in the 1949 New Zealand general election
Unsuccessful candidates in the 1954 New Zealand general election
Unsuccessful candidates in the 1960 New Zealand general election
Unsuccessful candidates in the 1963 New Zealand general election
Unsuccessful candidates in the 1966 New Zealand general election
People educated at Wellington College (New Zealand)